The cervical margin of a tooth is the surface above the junction of the crown of the tooth and the root of the tooth.

See also
 Dental terminology

References

Dental anatomy